Godfrey of Amiens (French: Geoffroy d'Amiens) (1066–1115) was a bishop of Amiens. He is a saint in the Catholic Church.

Life 
Godfrey was born to Frodon his father in 1066 in Moulincourt, in the Diocese of Soissons. When his mother died, his father decided to take up the monastic life. The third child in a noble family, Godfrey taken at the age of five, by his uncle, the Bishop of Soissons, who sent him to be educated in the Benedictine abbey of Mont-Saint-Quentin where his godfather Godefroid was abbot. While at Saint Quentin, Godfrey was given the charge of the sick, and appointed hospitaller, to receive the poor at the gate.

At the age of 25, he was ordained priest by the Bishop of Noyon and became the abbot of the Abbey of Nogent-sous-Coucy, Champagne in 1096. When he arrived, the place was overrun by weeds, but he rebuilt it, establishing a hostel for pilgrims.

He declined both the abbacy of Saint-Remi and the bishopric of Reims, before being compelled to accept the office of bishop of Amiens. King Philip and the Council of Troyes chose Godfrey in part because he was skilled in business affairs. Godfrey was noted for his rigid austerity with himself, those around him. He enforced clerical celibacy, and his opposition to drunkenness and simony, led to an attempt on his life. Godfrey would have preferred to Grande Chartreuse to maintain a life of penitence, and in 1114 moved to a monastery. However, in 1115, he was called back to his post.

He fell sick and took refuge in the abbey of Saint Crépin in Soissons, where he died November 8, 1115.

Veneration 
Godfrey of Amiens is remembered on November 8.
A street in Amiens is named after him.

Notes

Sources 
(fr) Essai sur Saint Geoffroy, évêque d'Amiens - Guérard - 1843
(fr) Histoire de la ville d'Amiens depuis les gaulois jusqu'à nos jours - R.de Hyacinthe Dusevel - 1848 - Amiens (France) - Page 259 - (Gallica)
(fr) Le livre des saints et des prénoms - Alain Guillermou - 1976 - Page 146

1066 births
1115 deaths
Bishops of Amiens
12th-century Christian saints
Medieval French saints